The following is a list of massacres and mass executions that occurred in Yugoslavia during World War II. Areas once part of Yugoslavia that are now parts of Bosnia and Herzegovina, Croatia, Kosovo, Serbia, Slovenia, North Macedonia, and Montenegro; see the lists of massacres in those countries for more details.

Perpetrators
The majority of massacres were committed by Yugoslav factions during the civil war, while a number were committed by invading Axis forces.

Ustaše

After the invasion of Yugoslavia, puppet-state Independent State of Croatia (NDH) was created by Axis powers in the areas of most of modern-day Croatia and Bosnia and Herzegovina. The Ustaše sought to create an ethnically clean state by eradicating Serbs, Jews and Romani through genocidal policies. According to Ustaše officials, the creation of an ethnically pure Greater Croatian state would ensure the safety of the Croats from the Serbs. From the data calculated by the German Ministry of Foreign Affairs, during the creation of the state the population of Serbs was approximately 1,925,000. The Ustaše's largest genocidal massacres were carried out in Bosanska Krajina and in places in Croatia where Serbs constituted a large proportion of the population including Banija, Kordun, Lika, and northern Dalmatia. Between 300 000– 350 000 Serbs were killed in massacres and in concentration camps like Jasenovac and Jadovno. Some 100,000 Serbs, Jews, and anti-fascist Croat were killed at Jasenovac alone.

Chetniks

The Chetniks wanted to forge an ethnically pure Greater Serbia claiming it was to ensure the survival of Serbs in Axis/Ustaše-controlled areas by violently "cleansing" these areas of Croats and Muslims. Several historians view Chetnik actions against Muslim and Croats as constituting genocide. Estimates of the number of deaths caused by the Chetniks in Croatia and Bosnia and Herzegovina range from 50,000 to 68,000, while more than 5,000 victims are registered in the region of Sandžak. About 300 villages and small towns were destroyed, along with a large number of mosques and Catholic churches. Chetnik massacres of the Bosniak population took place in eastern Bosnia which, according to historian Marko Attila Hoare, had been "relatively untouched" by the Ustaše until the spring of 1942. Bosnian historian Enver Redžić has a different opinion and claims that eastern Bosnia wasn't in relative peace at all during the period 1941–1942. He writes that in the summer of 1941, killings of Serbs had already started and acquired broader proportions in eastern Bosnia and that anti-Serb propaganda by Ustaše, by that time, had success among local Muslim and Croats. Bosniak Muslims, particularly in Eastern Bosnia, comprised a large contingent of Ustashe units in the region and played a large role in the genocide of ethnic Serbs in the area that began in 1941. Bosniaks, later in the war, also joined the Waffen SS units that were notorious for their cruelty to the Serbian population. The Serbian population in the Podrina region (Eastern Bosnia) declined significantly as a result of these massacres and ethnic cleansing.  Hoare argues that the latter-referenced massacres were not acts of revenge, but "an expression of the genocidal policy and ideology of the Chetnik movement."

Yugoslav Partisans
Yugoslav Partisans committed various massacres, notably as part of the so-called "leftist errors" against ideological opponents and suspected collaborators. At the end of the war, the Partisans "purged" in Serbia (1944–45), and massacred tens of thousands of suspected collaborators during the Bleiburg repatriations at the end and immediate aftermath of the war. Ethnic minorities, such as Italians, were persecuted during the Foibe massacres, while ethnic Germans were also massacred during the Flight and expulsion of Germans in Yugoslavia.

Axis occupying forces
German, Italian, Hungarian and Bulgarian occupying forces engaged in atrocities against the Yugoslavian population, in the form of mass-killings of civilians and hostages in retaliation for Partisan attacks and resistance. Infamous examples include the Kragujevac massacre, committed by German forces, as did the Albanian Waffen-SS units, which murdered more than 400 Orthodox Christian civilians at Andrijevica, the Novi Sad raid, committed by Hungarian forces and crimes committed by Italian forces, such as in Podhum.

List

See also
Bloody Christmas (1945)
List of massacres in the Bosnian War
List of massacres in the Croatian War
List of massacres in the Kosovo War

Notes

References

Sources

Books
 
 
 
 
 
 
 
 
 
 
 
 
 
 
 
 
 
 

 
 
 
 
 
 
 
 
 
 
 
 
 
 
 
 
 
 

Reports

Journals

Conference papers and proceedings
 
 

Web
 
 
 

Yugo
Yugoslavia, World War II
Massacres, World War II
World War II
World War II, Yugoslavia